Katryna Renée Gaither (born August 13, 1975) is a professional women’s basketball player.

Gaither attended college at Notre Dame. She ranks forth on the school’s all-time scoring list with 2,126 career points. She is only one of the five players in school history to have scored over 2,000 points. Additionally, she is the school’s third leading rebounder with 986 rebounds.

Career

College
1993-1997: Notre Dame Fighting Irish (NCAA)

ABL
1997-1999: San Jose Lasers

WNBA
2000: Utah Starzz
2000: Indiana Fever
2002: Los Angeles Sparks
2002: Washington Mystics

Asia
2001:  Hanvit

Europe
1998-1999:  CB Navarra
1999-2000:  Becast Vicenza
2000-2001:  Brisaspor İzmit
2002-2003:  DKSK Miskolc
2003-2006:  Tarbes GB
2006-2007:  Dexia Namur
March 2007: "Rest of the World" at the EuroLeague Women All-Star Game
2007-2008:  Dynamo Energie
2008-2009:   ACP Livorno

USA Basketball
Gaither was named to the team representing the USA at the 1999 Pan American Games. The team finished with a record of 4–3, but managed to win the bronze medal with an 85–59 victory over Brazil. Gaither averaged 1.2 points per game.

References

External links
WNBA Player Profile

1975 births
Living people
American women's basketball players
Centers (basketball)
Notre Dame Fighting Irish women's basketball players
Utah Starzz players
Indiana Fever players
Los Angeles Sparks players
Tarbes Gespe Bigorre players
Basketball players at the 1999 Pan American Games
Pan American Games bronze medalists for the United States
Pan American Games medalists in basketball
Medalists at the 1999 Pan American Games
United States women's national basketball team players